You're in the Super Bowl, Charlie Brown is the 37th prime-time animated television special based on Charles M. Schulz's comic strip Peanuts. It premiered on January 18, 1994 on NBC. It was the last new Peanuts special to air on television until A Charlie Brown Valentine in 2002, and the last before Schulz's death in 2000.

You're in the Super Bowl, Charlie Brown is notable for being the only Peanuts television special to debut on NBC; from 1965 to 2000, most Peanuts specials were aired by CBS. NBC aired this special as a tie-in with Super Bowl XXVIII, to which NBC held the rights that year; it was produced with the full cooperation of the National Football League, whose team uniforms are featured pervasively in the special.

Plot

As Lucy prepares to pull her usual trick of pulling the ball away from Charlie Brown as he tries to kick it, Peppermint Patty, Marcie, Franklin, and Linus arrive. They inform Lucy and Charlie Brown that there will be a Punt, Pass, and Kick contest, first prize wins a new bicycle and a trip to the Super Bowl, and suggests they all enter. As they discuss the contest, Charlie Brown seeks his chance to kick the ball when Lucy is not suspecting it—only for Lucy to blindly pull it away in perfect timing.

While Charlie Brown and Linus are practicing for the contest, they notice a very pretty girl, who catches Linus's attention. They walk to her, and introduce themselves to her. The girl says her name is Melody-Melody, and has been watching them. They flirt with her, and take her out for hot fudge sundaes. They then try to impress her, and try to tell her how they will be entering the punt-and-pass contest. Melody says she will be rooting for them at the contest.

At the punt-and-pass contest, Charlie Brown and Linus see Melody watching them, and they argue who Melody came to watch. The announcer announces every player, and every player gets a better score than the next one, except for Marcie who refuses to kick the football thinking the football did nothing to deserve being kicked. Charlie Brown performs well, finishing his turn in first place, only for Linus to best him. To the dismay of both, Melody turns out to be the final contestant, whose score beats all of the others. Betrayed, Linus admits to Charlie Brown that he was in love with her. Melody wins the new bicycle and the tickets to the Super Bowl.

Later, Charlie Brown and Linus are at the wall. Linus is so upset that the girl he was in love with beat him that he says he will never trust anyone again. Charlie Brown replies "Your sister says we can't go through life doubting everyone. We have to learn to trust each other" (echoing her bait line at the beginning of the special before pulling the football away from him). Lucy then comes to them holding a football, much to Charlie Brown's despondence.

Meanwhile, Snoopy coaches The Birds, a football team in Philadelphia Eagles attire and consisting of Woodstock and his avian friends, as they compete in the Animal Football League playoffs. In the Eastern final against the Cats (loosely based on the Detroit Lions), Woodstock and his team manage to beat the Cats 38–0. In the league semifinal, the Birds crush the Dogs 58–0. In the World Championship, The Birds take on The Bison (a parody of the Buffalo Bills). As the game begins, Lucy comes onto the field, and tells Snoopy he is a horrible coach, and his team will get crushed. But once again, The Birds crush the other team, 62–0 (again parodying Bills assistant coach Chuck Dickerson's disparaging the Washington Redskins prior to Super Bowl XXVI), winning the championship. After each touchdown the Birds introduce a different celebration dance, and after each win, they douse Snoopy in Chirpade—except the championship, when Lucy is on the receiving end of the Chirpade shower.

Cast
 Jimmy Guardino as Charlie Brown
Peter Robbins as Charlie Brown screaming (archived)
 John Christian Graas as Linus Van Pelt/Kid who yells/Announcer
 Molly Dunham as Lucy Van Pelt
 Haley Peel as Patricia "Peppermint Patty" Reichardt
 Nicole Fisher as Marcie
 Steve Stoliar as Announcer
 Crystal Kuns as Melody-Melody
 Bill Melendez as Snoopy, Woodstock

NFL uniforms worn
 Miss "Lucille" Van Pelt – Los Angeles Raiders
 Mr. Franklin Armstrong – Houston Oilers
 Miss Patricia Richardt – Denver Broncos
 Mr. Pig-Pen – Green Bay Packers
 Miss Marcie Johnson – Washington Commanders
 Mr. Charles Brown – San Francisco 49ers
 Mr. Linus van Pelt – Los Angeles Rams
 Miss Melody-Melody – Dallas Cowboys
 Birds – Philadelphia Eagles
 Cats – Detroit Lions
 Bison – Buffalo Bills

Production notes
This special was animated by Wang Film Productions in Taiwan. It was the second and final to be animated by them.

Franklin and Marcie, whose last names were never officially revealed during the course of the Peanuts comic strip, were given surnames for the first time in this special. Franklin's last name—Armstrong—was an homage to cartoonist Robb Armstrong, whose comic strip Jump Start was among the first broad-appeal comic strips to focus on a black family; Schulz called Armstrong to ask permission to use his name for the special, and Armstrong (who considered Schulz one of his biggest influences) consented without hesitation.

Music score
As with the preceding It's Christmastime Again, Charlie Brown, jazz pianist David Benoit performed and arranged the music score consisting of variations of songs originally performed by jazz pianist Vince Guaraldi. Guaraldi composed music scores for the first 16 Peanuts television specials and one feature film (A Boy Named Charlie Brown) before his untimely death in February 1976.

All songs written by Vince Guaraldi, except where noted.

"Charlie Brown Theme" (Vince Guaraldi, Lee Mendelson)
"Pebble Beach"
"Peppermint Patty"
"Air Music"
"Charlie Brown Theme" (reprise) (Vince Guaraldi, Lee Mendelson)
"Air Music" (reprise)
"Charlie Brown and His All-Stars"
"Air Music" (second reprise)
"Charlie Brown Theme" (second reprise) (Vince Guaraldi, Lee Mendelson)
"Linus and Lucy"
"Charlie Brown Theme" (end credits) (Vince Guaraldi, Lee Mendelson)

Releases

Television
You're in the Super Bowl, Charlie Brown first aired on January 18, 1994, and was the only animated Peanuts special to air on NBC, which had the rights to air the Super Bowl in 1994. (All previous Peanuts specials had aired on CBS, starting with the 1965 premiere of A Charlie Brown Christmas.) The special received an 8.0 rating and was watched by about 7.5 million households.

You're in the Super Bowl, Charlie Brown was the last Peanuts special to air on television before Charles Schulz's death in 2000. (Two more specials were produced, but they were released direct-to-video.) The next new special that aired on television was A Charlie Brown Valentine, which premiered on ABC in 2002. It was also the last Peanuts special produced using traditional cel animation.

Home media
You're in the Super Bowl, Charlie Brown is also the only Peanuts special that Paramount Home Entertainment or Warner Home Video, the last two holders of the Peanuts home media rights, does not have the video distribution rights to. Its lone video release, like It's Christmastime Again, Charlie Brown (1992) before it, was available in VHS format at participating Shell petrol stations. It is currently not available in DVD, Blu-ray or streaming formats.

References

External links

Peanuts television specials
Super Bowl-related television programming
NBC television specials
Television shows directed by Bill Melendez
1994 television specials
1990s American television specials
1990s animated television specials
American football animation
Television shows written by Charles M. Schulz